Schahram Dustdar is an Austrian computer scientist known for his work on distributed systems and elastic computing. Dustdar is a professor of computer science and head of the Distributed Systems Group  at TU Wien. He was named Fellow of the Institute of Electrical and Electronics Engineers (IEEE) in 2016 for contributions to elastic computing for cloud applications.

References 

Fellow Members of the IEEE
Living people
Year of birth missing (living people)
Place of birth missing (living people)